Kancha is a village panchayat located in the Samastipur district of Bihar state, India. The latitude 25.639962 and longitude 85.7589743 are the geocoordinate of the Kancha. Patna is the state capital for Kancha village. It is located around 63.1 kilometer away from Kancha. The other surrounding state capitals are Ranchi 257.2 km, Gangtok 340.9 km, Kolkata 431.5 km, 
The surrounding nearby villages and its distance from Kancha are Bangraha 2.2 km, Garhsisai 2.8 km, Badauna 5.2 km, Harpur Bochaha 5.3 km, Sahit 6.3 km, Sherpur Dhepura 10.0 km, Vidyapati Nagar 24.8 km, Maniyarpur, Simari.

See also
Samastipur
Hajipur
Bagmusha
Lal Keshwar Shiv Temple
Vidyapati Nagar
Kacchi Dargah-Bidupur Bridge
Shahpur Patori railway station
Patna-Sonepur-Hajipur Section
G.A.Inter School Hajipur
Khagaria Junction railway station
Mohiuddinnagar railway station
Hajipur-Muzaffarpur-Samastipur-Barauni Section
Akshaywat Rai Nagar Railway Station
Chak Sikandar Railway Station

References

Villages in Samastipur district